Jean Nicolas Grou (23 November 1731 – 13 December 1803) was a French Roman Catholic Jesuit priest, teacher, translator and mystic and spiritual writer. After the suppression of the Jesuit order, he sought sanctuary in the Dutch Republic. He returned to France, but at the outbreak of the French Revolution, he escaped to England where he gained refuge with a wealthy English household in Dorset whose house chaplain he became while continuing his literary output.

Youth
Jean Nicholas Grou was born in Calais, in the diocese of Boulogne. He was educated at the Lycée Louis-le-Grand in Paris, which at that time was under the direction of the Jesuits. At the age of fifteen, he entered the Jesuit novitiate. He made his first vows at the age of seventeen, and was put to teaching, according to the custom of the Society. He was particularly fond of Plato and Cicero, whose writings he appreciated for the style, and morals which for him, stood out from the majority of ancient authors. His study of Greek philosophy produced a French translation of Plato's Republic. He went on to translate Plato's Laws and then his other dialogues.

The Suppression of the Society of Jesus in France obliged Grou to seek refuge first in Lorraine which was then ruled by the former Polish monarch Stanisław Leszczyński. He lived for several years at Pont-à-Mousson, where he made his final vows in 1765 or 1766. After the death of Leszczyński, the Jesuits were also banished from Lorraine. Grou moved next to the United Provinces of the Netherlands, where he continued to work on Greek philosophy. He later returned to Paris, where he took the alias of Leclaire and to all appearances functioned as a diocesan priest. He divided his time between his studies and religious duties. Initially, the Archbishop of Paris, Christophe de Beaumont, employed him to write on religion and granted him a temporary pension, which eventually ceased.

Spiritual renewal
One of his brother priests introduced him to a nun of the Visitation who was believed to have received special spiritual gifts. She set him on the Way of Perfection and a life of prayer. Alongside his daily devotions and pastoral work, he focused on writing. He wrote several books on matters of piety, including, La Morale tirée des Confessions de Saint Augustin (1786), contrasting Christian morality with that of unbelievers, drawing on the teachings of Saint Augustine. Next was Les Caractéres de la Vraie Devotion (Marks of True Devotion, 1788), an essay to define true devotion is, and how to achieve it. This volume was quickly followed by the Maximes Spirituelles, avec des Explications (Spiritual Maxims Explained, 1789).

About the same time he also composed several short pious treatises, which he had copied for a devout lady of high rank whose spiritual director he then was. These manuscripts, which consisted of nine small volumes, have been preserved. He had also begun a major project which had taken fourteen years of research. Before leaving France for England, he had deposited the manuscripts of this work with a noblewoman, who was later arrested during the Reign of Terror, and whose servants burned the papers, fearing they might compromise their mistress.

French Revolution and move to England
Grou had taken a low profile. He had enjoyed a pension from the king, and was esteemed for his advice and his writings. When the revolution broke out, at first he wished to remain in Paris and continue his ministry in secret; but the nun friend persuaded him to seek refuge in England. He followed her advice, and was invited by another former Jesuit, who was then chaplain to a prominent English Catholic, Thomas Weld, a member of an old English recusant family and father of the future Cardinal Thomas Weld, to come and stay with his family. Taking up the invitation of the Welds at Lulworth Castle, Grou became spiritual director to members of the family. He was well regarded for his experience in the ways of the spiritual life. It was then that he learnt that his major project had gone up in flames and responded calmly, "If God had wished to derive any glory from this work, He would have preserved it."

Crypto-Jesuit at Lulworth
In England, he observed the Jesuit rule as far as he could: rising early to make his devotions and celebrating Mass daily, until his last illness. He practised his vows and only asked for the bare minimum for a simple life and to have some of his writing published. In 1796, he had printed in London, the Meditations, en forme de Retraite, sur I’Amour de Dieu (Meditations, in the form of a Retreat, upon the Love of God), and also a treatise called Don de Soi-mēme è Dieu (The Gift of One's Self to God). Whereas some theologians judged his ideas tended towards Quietism, a French bishop found them to be perfectly sound. He also published in London The School of Christ in English.

The Supplement to the Library of Jesuit Writers, published in Rome in 1816, mentions Grou's La Science du Crucifix, (The Science of the Crucifix); and its sequel, La Science Pratique du Crucifix dans l’usage des Sacrements de Pénitence et de Eucharistie (The Practical Science of the Crucifix in the use of the Sacraments of Penance and the Holy Eucharist).

Two years before his death, he had a bad attack of asthma. Some time after, he was seized with apoplexy and then with dropsy. His legs swelled to such an extent that he had to spend the last ten months of his life in an arm-chair. He continued to the very end to hear the confessions of the family with whom he lived. He ended his life in great piety.

Death
On 13 December 1803, at the age of seventy-two, Grou died at Lulworth Castle, where the Weld family had offered him hospitality which he had sought to repay by his thoughtful counsel, and by writing for Thomas Weld and his children some of his more insightful works on Christian asceticism.

The popular American author of spiritual tracts, Philip Yancey, has stated that Grou was "a mystic from the eighteenth century, [who] prescribed that healthy prayer should be humble, reverent, loving, confident, and persevering — in other words, the exact opposite of impatient."

Grou's numerous manuscripts were left to his former companions in religion, who in 1815, published L’Intérieur de Jesus et de Marie (The Inner Life of Jesus and Mary), a work reprinted several times since.

Works
Characteristics of true devotion
The Christian Sanctified by the Lord's Prayer
The Hidden Life of the Soul
How to Pray
The Interior of Jesus and Mary
The Ladder of Sanctity
A Little Book on the Love of God
Self-consecration
Manual for Interior Soul
Meditations on the Love of God
The Practical Science of the Cross
The Spiritual Maxims of Père Grou

Jean Nicolas Grou's writings are also listed at the Open Library and Library Thing.

References

1731 births
1803 deaths
Catholic spirituality
Roman Catholic mystics
18th-century French Jesuits
18th-century Christian mystics
French religious writers
People from Calais
French male writers